"Had Enough" is a song by British rock band the Enemy from their debut studio album, We'll Live and Die in These Towns (2007). Released on 25 June 2007, "Had Enough" became the band's highest-charting single in the United Kingdom, peaking at number four on the UK Singles Chart in July 2007.

Track listing
UK CD single
 "Had Enough"
 "Dancin' All Night"

UK 7-inch picture disc
A. "Had Enough"
B. "Shed a Tear"

UK 7-inch single
A. "Had Enough"
B. "40 Day and 40 Nights" (Zane Lowe Session)

Credits and personnel
Credits are lifted from the UK CD single and the We'll Live and Die in These Towns booklet.

Studio
 Mastered at Alchemy (London, England)

Personnel
 The Enemy – writing
 Barny – production, mixing
 John Davis – mastering
 Tourist – artwork design

Charts

Weekly charts

Year-end charts

References

2007 singles
2007 songs
The Enemy (UK rock band) songs
Warner Records singles